Some Girls & Trouble Boys is a 1979 Wizex studio album. The album peaked at #21 in the Swedish albums chart.

Track listing

Side 1

Side 2

Charts

References 

1979 albums
Wizex albums